Calapo or Kallapu (Aymara for stairs close to the walls, a step of the stairs in a mine; buttress, wood to prop up, Hispanicized spelling Calapo) is a mountain in the Huallanca mountain range in the Andes of Peru which reaches an altitude of approximately . It is located in the Ancash Region, Bolognesi Province, Aquia District, east of the town of Pachapaqui.

References 

Mountains of Peru
Mountains of Ancash Region